Foroogh Mouri (born 30 September 1989) is an Iranian footballer who plays as a forward for Kowsar Women Football League club Vachan Kurdistan and the Iran women's national team.

International goals

References 

1989 births
Living people
Iranian women's footballers
Iran women's international footballers
Women's association football forwards
People from Shushtar
Sportspeople from Khuzestan province
21st-century Iranian women